This is a list of historical and traditional city neighborhoods or quarters with a significant Serbian population.

Modern

Historical
 Serbian Quarter, Prizren, Serbia
The neighborhood was attacked in an Albanian Pogrom in 2004, burning several churches and buildings. Since then the Serb population has dropped dramatically.
 Serbian Quarter, Székesfehérvár, Hungary
Serbs settled during the Ottoman-Austrian wars in the 17th century.
 Serb Street, Budapest, Hungary
 Belgrad Forest, Sarıyer, Istanbul, Turkey
After the sacking of Belgrade in the 16th century, Sultan Suleiman the Magnificent settled thousands of Serbs into the wooded area of Istanbul.
 Balkan Street, Zurich, Switzerland
 Logan Square, Chicago, Illinois, United States
 Goodrich–Kirtland Park, Cleveland, Ohio, United States
Most Serbs lived in the area north of Superior Ave between East 20th and 40th streets. Hamilton and St.Clair avenues were particularly dense areas of Serbian settlement.

References

Serbian
Serbian diaspora
Serb diaspora